Phitsanulok is a city, municipality, the capital and the largest populated place of the Thai province of Phitsanulok. It is also the headquarters of the Mueang Phitsanulok District. In 2022, it had a population of 62,000, making it the second–largest cities by population in the lower northern Thailand. The city is one of the centre of Thailand's tourism industry, and it is a historic city in the country.

Toponymy

Song Khwae: The first element, song, means the number 'two'.  The second element, khwae, means 'tributary', hence 'two rivers'.
Phitsanulok: The first element, Phitsanu (Thai:  พิษณุ; Sanskrit: viṣṇu विष्णु "Vishnu"), is a cognate of 'Vishnu', a Hindu god (see, e.g., Witnu, Thai:  วิษณุ).  Lack of a v sound in the Thai language accounts for the two forms. The second element, lok (Thai:  โลก; Sanskrit: loka लोक 'world') means 'globe' or 'world'.  A loose translation of the entire name would be 'Vishnu's heaven'.

History

Phitsanulok is one of the oldest cities in Thailand, founded over 600 years ago. Phitsanulok was also a provincial center of the Khmer Empire during the Angkorian period.

Phitsanulok was originally named "Song Khwae" (lit. "Two Rivers") as it used to situate between the Nan and Khwae Noi Rivers, although the Khwae Noi River now drains into Nan River at ten kilometers to the north of Phitsanulok. The Northern Chronicles credited the foundation of Song Khwae to "King Srithampidok" or King Thammaracha I of Sukhothai, on the east bank of Nan River. King Thammaracha I also constructed the Wat Phra Si Rattana Mahathat and cast famous Buddha images of Phra Buddha Chinnarat and Phra Buddha Chinnasri. Song Khwae eclipsed Sukhothai in importance, becoming the royal seat of Sukhothai Kingdom in 1378. After the demise of the last King of Sukhothai at Song Khwae in 1438, Prince Ramesuan of Ayutthaya came to rule Song Khwae. When Prince Ramesuan was crowned as King Trailokanat of Ayutthaya in 1448, Song Khwae and the Sukhothai Kingdom were incorporated into the Ayutthaya Kingdom.

During the Ayutthaya-Lanna War, King Trailokanat moved his residence to Song Khwae in 1464 and renamed the city "Phitsanulok" (from Sanskrit Vishnu and Loka "world"). He expanded the city westward to the west bank of Nan River. In the sixteenth century, Phitsanulok was the seat of Uparaja or heir presumptive to Ayutthaya throne who took residence in the Chantana Palace on the west bank. In 1548, King Maha Chakkraphat appointed his supporter Phra Pirenthorathep as "King Thammaracha" of Phitsanulok as a tributary ruler. During the Burmese-Siamese Wars, Phitsanulok and the Sukhothai region became battlegrounds between Burma and Siam. When King Bayinnaung invaded Phitsanulok in 1563, King Thammaracha of Phitsanulok submitted to the Burmese.

King Thammaracha, now reigned at Ayutthaya, appointed his son Prince Naresuan as the Uparaja of Phitsanulok in 1570. In 1584, Prince Naresuan ordered the evacuation of all cities in the Sukhothai region including Phitsanulok down south in preparations against Burmese invasions. Phitsanulok was abandoned until it was later restored in 1593 not as a Uparaja seat but as a Muang Ek or first-level city held by a governor, becoming the center of Siamese administrations in northern regions. The governors of Phitsanulok held the title "Chao Phraya Surasi". After the Second Fall of Ayutthaya in 1767, Phitsanulok came under the rule of Chao Phra Fang, a monk who declared himself a local lord based on the town of Fang (modern Uttaradit). King Taksin of Thonburi sent forces to capture Phitsanulok in 1768 and appointed Boonma (later Prince Maha Sura Singhanat) as Chao Phraya Surasi the governor of Phitsanulok.

The Burmese General Maha Thiha Thura laid siege on Phitsanulok in 1775. Chao Phraya Chakri (future King Rama I) and his brother Chao Phraya Surasi Boonma held the city for four months until the city finally fell to the Burmese. Phitsanulok was utterly destroyed on this occasion. The Burmese invaded again in 1785 and Phitsanulok was abandoned temporarily because the manpower shortage left the city defenseless. After the series of warfare, Phitsanulok was in ruins and depopulated through the nineteenth century. The Phra Buddha Chinnasri image was moved to Wat Baworn Niwet in Bangkok in 1829. In 1834, the Phuan people were deported from Muang Phuan in Laos to re-populate Phitsanulok and surrounding cities. Phitsanulok slowly recovered to be an urban center.

As a part of reforms of King Chulalongkorn, Phitsanulok became the administrative seat of the  monthon Phitsanulok in 1894. When the monthons were abolished in 1932, Phitsanulok became the capital of Phitsanulok Province.

The Phitsanulok fire of 1957 destroyed much of the older portion of the city, which at the time consisted mostly of wooden buildings.
On 28 November 1961, the King Naresuan Shrine was completed at Chandra Palace.
On 25 January 1967, the Phitsanulok campus of what is now Naresuan University was established as the northern branch of the degree level College of Education. In 1974, the College of Education was upgraded as Srinakharinwirot University, with Phitsanulok as one of the six campuses. In 1990, the regional campuses became independent universities, and the Phitsanuloke campus was named after Phitsanulok-born King Naresuan the Great. 
Naresuan Dam was constructed from 1976 to 1985 on the Nan River as part of the Phitsanulok Irrigation Project. The dam was designed to help prevent flooding of the city.
On 8 March 1999 Phitsanulok was upgraded to city municipality (thesaban nakhon).

Symbols

 (photo left) From left to right: three figures symbolize Wat Yai: Phra Attharot, a 9 meter high standing Buddha image, the 36 meter high prang and the entrance gate of Vihara Luang, which enshrines Buddha Chinnarat; a nature park with a waterfall; for houseboats on the Nan river; King Naresuan riding his war elephant; hat-shaped tower.
 (photo right) above: Seal of Phitsanulok City depicts King Naresuan, shown riding his war elephant (yellow), bottom:  Phitsanulok City (Thai: thesaban nakhon Phitsanulok) (green).

Geography

Location

Phitsanulok is in the north of Thailand. Phitsanulok is about 377 kilometres north of Bangkok by road. Phitsanulok covers some 10,815 square kilometres, or 6.4% of area in the north of Thailand and 2.1% of the area of Thailand. Phitsanulok borders on the north and the north-east of Thailand. The north is adjacent to Uttaradit and Laos. The south is adjacent to Phichit. The east is adjacent to Loei and Phetchabun. The west is adjacent to Kamphaeng Phet Province and Sukhothai.
Phitsanulok has many waterfalls, forests and caves. In the north is central area. In the north-west is a highland. It's the important recreational area such as Kaeng Sopha waterfall, Phu Hin Rong Kla and Phu Soi Dow. In the south plains along the Yom River and the Nan River is the most important agricultural district of Phitsanulok.

Topography
Phitsanulok lies primarily on flatland with some hills.  The eastern portion of the city has some wooded area. The city is in the Nan Basin, which is part of the Chao Phraya watershed. Phitsanulok is sometimes called Song Kwae, the city of two rivers, a name dating to a time centuries ago when the Nan and Khwae Noi Rivers met near the city.  Today, only the Nan River flows through Phitsanulok.

Climate
Phitsanulok has a tropical savanna climate (Köppen climate classification Aw). Winters are dry and very warm. The monsoon season runs from May through October, with heavy rain and somewhat cooler temperatures during the day, although nights remain warm.

Administration

According to Municipal Act B.E. 2496 (1953, reviewed in 2003), the duties of the municipality include: clean water supply, waste and sewage disposal, communicable disease control, public training and education, public hospitals and electricity. The mayor, or the highest executive, is directly elected by the eligible voters in the municipal area. The mayor serves a four-year term and is assisted by no more than four deputy mayors appointed directly by the mayor. The Municipal Council is the legislative body of the municipality. It has the power to issue ordinances by laws, that do not contradict the laws of the country. The municipal council's jurisdiction applies to all people living in the municipal area.

Demographics

Ethnic diversity
The majority ethnicity in the city is Thai. Others in the city consider themselves of Mon descent.

Language
The majority of residents of Phitsanulok speak central Thai.

Religion
The people of Phitsanulok are predominantly Theravada Buddhists (as are 95% of the Thai population as a whole), with a small Christian community and a few Muslim families.

Education

Educational institutions

Naresuan University (abbreviated Mor Nor for Mahawithayalai Naresuan) is an educational center of the lower northern region of Thailand. Now in Tha Pho, near the city of Phitsanulok, the university was named after King Naresuan the Great, and the campus features a large statue of him. Other universities and colleges in or around the city include Phitsanulok University  (private), Sirindhorn College of Public Health, Rajabhat Pibulsongkram University (formerly a teacher training college), and the Phitsanulok campus of the Rajamangala University of Technology Lanna.

Vocational institutions
There are three vocational colleges in the city:
 Phitsanulok Technical College.
 Phitsanulok Vocational College.
 Songkwae Technical College

Secondary (Mathayom) institutions
Phitsanulok City is home to three secondary institutions: 
 Chalermkwansatree school.
 Janokrong school. 
 Puttha Chinnarat Pitthaya school.

Healthcare
There is one government hospital in Phitsanulok City: Buddhachinaraj Phitsanulok Hospital with 1,000 beds.
There are also five private hospitals with 400 beds total:
 Bangkok Hospital Phitsanulok 
 Phitsanulok Hospital  
 Pitsanuvej Hospital 
 Ruamphaet Hospital
 Radiotherapy and Nuclear Medicine Hospital

Infrastructure

Airport
Close to the city center (Aranyik), Phitsanulok Airport receives up to six flights a day from Bangkok (flight time approximately 60 minutes), which are operated by three airlines: Nok Air, Thai Air Asia and Thai Lion Air.

Roads
Road 126, a multi-lane by-pass enables through-traffic to avoid the city of Phitsanulok, and connects to highway 11 to Uttaradit and Lampang in the north, and to highway 12 to Phetchabun in the east, and to highway 11 to Sing Buri in the south, and to highway 117 to Nakhon Sawan in the south, and to highway 12 to Sukhothai, Tak and Mae Sot in the west.

Buses

Phitsanulok Terminal 1 (Saen Phon Phai) and Terminal 2 (Samo Khae) provide the mass transport throughout Phitsanulok Province by some eight bus companies. Four minibus lines provide transportation around the city. Yanyon tour operates its own private bus station (Sua Thim) with only a busline to Bangkok.

Railway
In the city center, Phitsanulok railway station mainly receives intercity trains on the Northern Line, operated by State Railway of Thailand, more than a dozen trains running in each direction each day.

Media
The main channels for communication in the city are television and radio.  The following public television and radio stations are broadcast from Phitsanulok:

Sathaanii Witthayu Krajaisiang Thahaan Aakaat (Air Force Radio Station), 954 AM and 95.75, in the City of Phitsanulok
Witthayu Kong Phon Thahaan Raap Thii Sii (4th Infantry Division), 1377 AM, at Fort Somdet Phra Naresuan Maharat
Sathaanii Witthayu Phitaksantiraat (Communications Division, Royal Thai Police), 1422 AM, in Phitsanulok City
ARMY-5 (television channel 5, owned and operated by the Royal Thai Army)
PRD-11 (television channel 11, owned and operated by the Government Public Relations Department)

Royal Thai Army
Phitsanulok is home to the Third Army Region of the Royal Thai Army, responsible for the northern and north-western parts of the kingdom.

Temples

Wat Phra Sri Rattana Mahathat

Phitsanulok's main tourist attraction is Wat Phra Sri Rattana Mahathat, known locally simply as Wat Yai (the big temple). This famous temple, built in 1357, is home to the Phra Buddha Chinnarat, which is one of the most revered Buddha figures in Thailand, and the official symbol of Phitsanulok Province. The beautiful mother-of-pearl inlaid doors were built in 1756 by order of King Boromakot of Ayutthaya. The Buddha Chinnarat National Museum, on the temple grounds, houses a sizeable collection of Sukhothai period art.

Other temples

The city is also home to the following temples where Theravada Buddhism is practiced by city residents (from north clockwise):
 Wat Tammachak
 Wat Chedi Yod Thong
 Wat Aranyik
 Wat Nang Phaya, not a temple but a monastery
 Wat Ratcha Burana
 Wat Mai Opai Yaram
 Wat Si Wisut Tharam
 Wat Nong Bua Mai
 Wat Tha Maprang
 Wat Sa Kaew Phatum Thong
 Wat Chan Tawan Ook
 Wat Chan Tawan Tok
 Wat Phan Pee
 Wat Kuha Sawan

Sports
Dragon boat racing has historically been an important element of Phitsanulok culture.  In recent times, football (soccer) has become increasingly popular. In 2005, Phitsanulok won the 2nd Northern Youth Football Championship in the U12 and U15 age groups.

Traditional Thai boxing is also a major sport in the city.

Culture

Art
Phitsanulok is home to a number of historic sculptures of the Buddha and other religious artwork including the Buddha Chinnarat, the Buddha Chinnasi, the Phra Si Satsada.

Literature
Examples of important literary works of Phitsanulok include:
Lilit Yuan Pai (Thai:  ลิลิตยวนพ่าย, English: Tale of the Fall of Lanna)
Lilit Prá Lô (Thai:  ลิลิตพระลอ, English: Tale of the Hero Lô)
Klohng Táwâatsàmàat (Thai:  โคลงทวาทศมาส, English:  Poem of the Twelve Months)
Gam Sŏn Sĕe Bpràat (Thai:  กำศรวลศรีปราชญ์, English:  The Legendary Wise Archer's Grip)

The predominant literary language (as well as the predominant spoken language) is the central Thai dialect of the Thai language, which is written in the Thai alphabet.

Other attractions

 Buranathai Buddha Foundry: Specializes in casting bronze Buddha images.  It is the only establishment of its kind in the province.  Craftspersons specialize in the reproduction of the Phra Buddha Chinnarat Buddha image. Visitors are permitted to walk along the production line.
 Sergeant-Major Dr. Thawee Buranakhet Folklore Museum: Hosts a collection of folk arts, crafts, basketry, pottery and ancient kitchen utensils.  The museum also houses a collection of antique traps for catching snakes, birds, tigers and porcupines.
 City walls: Most of the older portions of Phitsanulok were destroyed in a 1955 fire. Thus little else remains of the old town besides the famous temple, an ancient chedi across the road from it, and a small section of the city wall. The intact portion of the ancient city wall is accessible to visitors.
 Night Market: Each evening, vendors gather to form Phitsanulok's night market. Items sold include clothing and food, usually at reduced prices.
 Chan Palace was the birthplace of King Naresuan the Great, and contains a shrine to him.
 Naresuan University Art and Culture Gallery: The gallery holds over 100 artistic artworks of culturally significant Thai artists.
 Nan River Houseboats: Phitsanulok is known throughout Thailand for the houseboats which still line the Nan River near Wat Phra Sri Rattana Maharat, though in recent years these are becoming fewer. A houseboat museum is open to visitors.

Festivals and events
 Phra Buddha Chinnarat Fair: Held each January at Wat Phra Sri Rattana Mahatat Woramahawihan.
 Suan Chom Nan Park Festival: Held twice a year along the Nan River.  Food and local products are on sale.
 Dragon Boat Races: On the first weekend of each October, dragon boat races are held outside Wat Phra Sri Rattana Mahatat Woramahawihan in the Nan River.  Each dragon boat has a crew of approximately 30 oarsmen.

References

External links

 
Populated places in Phitsanulok province
Nan River
Cities and towns in Thailand